This a list of the 400 members of the Legislature XIX of Italy of the Italian Chamber of Deputies. All of them were elected in the snap 2022 Italian general election and assumed office on 13 October 2022.

The list of those elected was confirmed by the minutes from the National Central Electoral Office, at the Supreme Court of Cassation, which on 8 October 2022 concluded the process of assigning seats.

Current composition

Former members

References

See also 

 Chamber of Deputies (Italy)
 Legislature XIX of Italy
 List of members of the Italian Senate, 2022–

Deputies of Legislature XIX of Italy
Italy